Pretty Saro (Roud 417) is an English folk ballad originating in the early 1700s. The song died out in England by the mid eighteenth century but was rediscovered in North America (particularly in the Appalachian Mountains) in the early twentieth century, where it had been preserved through oral traditions. Cecil Sharp and later folklorists and proponents of the folk revival helped keep songs such as Pretty Saro alive well into modern times.

Traditional Versions 
The famous Appalachian musician Jean Ritchie was recorded with her sisters in 1946 by Mary Elizabeth Barnacle singing her family's traditional version on the song, before recording it on the album Jean Ritchie And Doc Watson At Folk City (1963). The Appalachian traditional singer Horton Barker also recorded a traditional version on his eponymous 1962 album. Several other traditional Appalachian versions were recorded, particularly by Alan Lomax A few traditional Ozark recordings were also made (many of which can be heard online), and one in Toronto, Canada.

Popular Recordings

Notable artists who have recorded Pretty Saro include:

During his Self Portrait sessions in March 1970 at Columbia Records' New York studio, Bob Dylan ran through "Pretty Saro" six consecutive times. While none of those versions made the final cut for the album, the song remained in Columbia's vault, until it was released on Another Self Portrait, a 35-track box set of songs cut for Nashville Skyline, Self Portrait and New Morning.

References

English folk songs
Bob Dylan songs